Give Us This Day is a Philippine two-hour religious television program produced by the Sonshine Media Network International. It is hosted by Pastor Apollo C. Quiboloy. It features fresh "manna of revelations", comments form both text and e-mails, and live Kingdom Music by the Kingdom Musicians. The show debuted on May 28, 2003, and airs live Mondays to Fridays at 7:00 PM on SMNI TV 43 Davao and SMNI News Channel.

Previously aired on these networks
 ETC/SBN

2003 Philippine television series debuts
Philippine religious television series
Sonshine Media Network International
English-language television shows